Zebra IV is the fourth, and last to date, album by American hard rock trio Zebra. It was released on 8 July 2003, 20 years after their 1983 debut album, and 17 years after their last studio effort, 3.V from 1986.

Track listing

Personnel

Band members 
 Randy Jackson – guitar, lead vocals, keyboards
 Felix Hanemann – bass, backing vocals, keyboards
 Guy Gelso – drums, backing vocals, percussion

Additional musicians
 Chillie Willie – Saxophone

Production
 Randy Jackson – Producer, Engineer
 Joel Singer – Technical adviser
 Mark Hitt – Composer
 Wendy Baner – Graphic design
 Charles Demar – Artwork, Design
 Robert Geiger – Photography

References 

Zebra (band) albums
2003 albums